James McCrone Johnstone (born 17 April 1990) is a Scottish rugby union player who plays centre for the Scotland 7s team.

Johnstone previously played for Edinburgh Rugby in the United Rugby Championship.

Career
Johnstone was part of the Scotland 7s squad at the 2014 Commonwealth Games.

Johnstone made his Edinburgh Rugby debut against Leinster at Meggetland Sports Complex in September 2015.

References

External links 
 http://www.scotlandrugbyteam.org/content/view/2465/210/

1990 births
Living people
People educated at Merchiston Castle School
Scottish rugby union players
Edinburgh Rugby players
Glasgow Warriors players
Scotland international rugby sevens players
Male rugby sevens players
Rugby union centres
Rugby union players from Dumfries